The 2022-2023 edition of the FIDE Grand Prix will be a series of four chess tournaments exclusively for women which will determine two players to play in the Women's Candidates Tournament 2023–2024. The winner of the Candidates Tournament will play the reigning world champion in the next Women's World Chess Championship.

This will be the sixth cycle of the tournament series. Each of 16 players shall participate in three out of four tournaments, and every tournament shall be a twelve-player round robin event. The tournaments are planned to be held between September 2022 and May 2023.

Players 
16 players qualified for the Grand Prix:

 Women's World Chess Champion.
 Four semifinalists of Women's Chess World Cup 2021.
 The top 4 finishers in the FIDE Women's Grand Swiss Tournament 2021, excluding those who already qualified for the Grand Prix.
 3 players with highest rating in the March 2022 rating list, who played at least 1 rated game counted in one of the Standard FIDE Rating Lists from April 2021 to March 2022 (Humpy Koneru wasn't eligible because of this condition), excluding those who already qualified for the Grand Prix.
 4 organizer's nominees.
After Ju Wenjun (Women's World Champion), Lei Tingjie (winner of Women's Grand Swiss) and Hou Yifan (qualified by rating as #1) decided not to participate, replacements were also invited by March 2022 rating list.

Schedule

Crosstables

Grand Prix standings 

For each tournament, 160 Grand Prix points will be awarded for 1st place, 130 for 2nd, 110 for 3rd and then in steps of 10 from 90 for 4th to 10 for 12th place. If players ended up tied on points, points for those places will be shared equally.

Top two players in Grand Prix standings will qualify for Women's Candidates Tournament 2023–2024.

All replacements (in italics) are eligible for Grand Prix points and Candidates qualification.

Notes

References 

Women's chess competitions
2022 in chess
2023 in chess
FIDE Grand Prix
Current chess seasons